Zeroth law may refer to:

 Zeroth law of black hole thermodynamics, about event horizons of black holes
 Zeroth law of robotics, an addition to Isaac Asimov's Three Laws of Robotics
 Zeroth law of thermodynamics, in relation to thermal equilibriums

See also
 Zeroth (disambiguation)